Chris Robertson (born 25 December 1957) is a Scottish former professional football player who is best known for his time with Hearts and Meadowbank Thistle

Born in Edinburgh, Robertson started his career a Salvesen's Boys Club and moved to Rangers in 1976. He stayed at the club for three years before moving on to Hearts for two seasons. Robertson was then to have the first of two spells at Meadowbank Thistle, which had stints with Cowdenbeath and Raith Rovers separating them. In 1983, he joined Thistle permanently and went on to make close to 100 appearances in a four-year stay. A brief spell with Berwick Rangers followed in 1987 before Robertson moved to the junior leagues with Bonnyrigg Rose Athletic.

References

Living people
Footballers from Edinburgh
Association football forwards
Heart of Midlothian F.C. players
Rangers F.C. players
Livingston F.C. players
Cowdenbeath F.C. players
Raith Rovers F.C. players
Berwick Rangers F.C. players
Scottish footballers
1957 births
Scotland under-21 international footballers
Scottish Football League players
Association football midfielders